Kai Veesamma Kai Veesu is a 1989 Indian Tamil-language film directed by Vinodh, starring Raadhika and Nirosha.

Plot

Cast
Murali
Raadhika
Nirosha
Srikanth
Nizhalgal Ravi
Chinni Jayanth
Jai Ganesh
Rajya Lakshmi
S. S. Chandran
Kovai Sarala
Vennira Aadai Moorthy
Vinu Chakravarthy
Nassar

Soundtrack
The soundtrack was composed by Ilaiyaraaja.

Reception
P. S. S. of Kalki praised the cinematography and dialogues but criticised the presentation of the film.

References

External links
 

1980 films
1980s Tamil-language films
1989 films
Films scored by Ilaiyaraaja